The Estadio Joel Gutiérrez is an association football (soccer) stadium in Tacna, Peru. It has a capacity of 21,000. The venue opened on 30 July 1995. Alfonso Ugarte (Tacna) are the tenants of the stadium.

References

Sports venues in Peru